Pavlo Gurkovsky (born 9 October 1985) is a Ukrainian handball player for HC Motor Zaporizhia and the Ukrainian national team.

He represented Ukraine at the 2020 European Men's Handball Championship.

References

1985 births
Living people
Ukrainian male handball players
Sportspeople from Zaporizhzhia
HC Motor Zaporizhia players
ZTR players
21st-century Ukrainian people